Gavkach, also rendered as Gavkaj or Gavgach, may refer to:
 Gavkach-e Olya
 Gavkach-e Sofla